There are at least 28 members of the dogbane, gentian and milkweed order, Gentianales, found in Montana. Some of these species are exotics (not native to Montana) and some species have been designated as Species of Concern.

Dogbanes
Family: Apocynaceae 
Apocynum androsaemifolium, spreading dogbane
Apocynum cannabinum, clasping-leaf dogbane

Gentians

Family: Gentianaceae 
Centaurium exaltatum, western centaury
Eustoma grandiflorum, showy prairie-gentian
Frasera albicaulis, white-stem frasera
Frasera speciosa, green gentian
Gentiana affinis, prairie gentian
Gentiana algida, whitish gentian
Gentiana calycosa, explorer's gentian
Gentiana fremontii, moss gentian
Gentiana glauca, glaucous gentian
Gentiana prostrata, pygmy gentian
Gentianella amarella, northern gentian
Gentianella propinqua, four-parted gentian
Gentianella tenella, slender gentian
Gentianopsis macounii, Macoun's gentian
Gentianopsis simplex, hiker's gentian
Gentianopsis thermalis, Rocky Mountain fringed gentian
Halenia deflexa, spurred gentian
Lomatogonium rotatum, marsh felwort
Swertia perennis, felwort

Milkweeds

Family: Asclepiadaceae 
Asclepias incarnata, swamp milkweed
Asclepias ovalifolia, ovalleaf milkweed
Asclepias pumila, low milkweed
Asclepias speciosa, showy milkweed
Asclepias stenophylla, narrowleaf milkweed
Asclepias verticillata, whorled milkweed
Asclepias viridiflora, green milkweed

Further reading

See also
 List of dicotyledons of Montana

Notes

Montana
Montana